3 in the UK offer a Mobile TV service across most of their range of phones. It is provided by 3 and independent companies and offers the main genres of: Comedy, Entertainment, Music, Documentaries, Kids programming and user-submitted content. Whilst many of the channels take on the branding of regular channels (for example, MTV and Nickeleodeon), the content is actually a "loop" of programming that tends to be updated once a week, rather than the full content available through digital television or cable services.

Pricing

3 Mobile TV is available in 3 ways:

 By pay-per-day for 49p. This gives 24 hours of unlimited access to all channels.
 By buying a monthly add-on for £5. Open to Pay monthly (contract) customers only. This gives access to all channels for exactly 1 month.
 By buying a PAYG Mobile TV add-on for £2. This gives access to a restricted service of 4 channels: ITV1, Kiss, Geek TV and MTV Trax. This add-on is valid for exactly 1 month.

Channel listing

 Aardman Animations (exclusive, updated weekly)
 ITV1 (live, but due to legal issues, is unable to show advertisement breaks or certain programmes, mostly sports and films) 
 FHM (updated weekly)
 MTV Trax (music videos, updated daily)
 MTV Snax (MTV non-music programming, updated weekly)
 Nickeleodeon (children's programming, updated weekly)
 Vidzone TV (music videos, exclusive, updated weekly)
 Paramount Comedy (updated weekly)
 Geek TV (comedy clips, cartoons and user-generated content, exclusive, updated weekly)
 National Geographic (updated weekly)
 Kerrang! (music videos, updated daily)
 Kiss (music videos)

Former channels

 Zone Reality
 Six Degrees Extreme Sports
 ITN
 ITV Play
 BBC1
 BBC3

The BBC channels were broadcast on 3 for a trial period, and are not currently available.

Issues

 All channels (except ITV1) must be re-connected to after 20 minutes to continue viewing.
 ITV1 must be re-connected to after 30 minutes to continue viewing.
 Most channels are updated weekly.
 The only live channel is ITV1.
 ITV 1 cannot show certain shows.
 National Geographic shows merely clips of its programmes.
 Currently offers no BBC channels.
 A high ratio of music channels compared to other genres.

Related services

3 in the UK also offer a selection of "Free videos" or "Free to watch" content. These are funded by advertisements (Unlike mobile TV which has no commercial advertisements).
The main competitor is Sky Mobile TV, available on  Vodafone UK, o2 UK and T-mobile UK. Also MobiTV was a former competitor offered on Virgin Mobile, but has now ceased operations in Europe.

External links
 3 Mobile TV official site

Mobile telephone broadcasting